Sinéad Morrissey (born 24 April 1972 in Portadown, County Armagh) is a Northern Irish poet. In January 2014 she won the T. S. Eliot Prize for her fifth collection Parallax and in 2017 she won the Forward Prize for Poetry for her sixth collection On Balance.

Life

Raised in Belfast, she was educated at Trinity College, Dublin, where she took BA and PhD degrees. After periods living in Japan and New Zealand she now lives in Newcastle. She was appointed writer-in-residence and then Reader in Creative Writing at Queen's University, Belfast. In 2016 she was appointed Professor of Creative Writing at the University of Newcastle.  Morrissey has two children.

Works
She has published six collections of poetry: There Was Fire in Vancouver (1996), Between Here and There (2001), The State of the Prisons (2005), Through the Square Window (2009), and Parallax (2013), the second, third and fourth of which were shortlisted for the T. S. Eliot Prize. In 2017 she published her sixth collection On Balance, which was awarded the Forward Prize for Poetry.

Awards
She won the Patrick Kavanagh Poetry Award in 1990. Her collection, The State of the Prisons, was shortlisted for the Poetry Now Award in 2006. The same collection won the Michael Hartnett Poetry Prize in 2005. In November 2007, she received a Lannan Foundation Fellowship for "distinctive literary merit and for demonstrating potential for continued outstanding work". Her poem "Through the Square Window" won first prize in the 2007 British National Poetry Competition. Her collection, Through the Square Window, won the Poetry Now Award for 2010.

In January 2014 Morrissey won the T.S. Eliot Prize for her fifth collection Parallax. The chair of the judging panel, Ian Duhig, remarked that the collection was 'politically, historically and personally ambitious, expressed in beautifully turned language, her book is as many-angled and any-angled as its title suggests.'

In September 2017 Morrissey's sixth collection On Balance was awarded the Forward Poetry Prize for Best Collection. In 2019 she was a contributor to A New Divan: A Lyrical Dialogue between East and West (Gingko Library).

Bibliography
 There Was Fire in Vancouver (Carcanet Press, 1996)
 Between Here and There (Carcanet Press, 2001)
 The State of the Prisons (Carcanet Press, 2005)
 Through the Square Window (Carcanet Press, 2009)
 Parallax: And Selected Poems (Carcanet Press, 2013)
 On Balance (Carcanet Press, 2017)

Pamphlets and Limited Editions

 The Italian Chapel - (Metal engravings by Maribel Mas. Published by Andrew J Moorhouse, Fine Press Poetry, 2019)

See also

 List of Northern Irish writers

References

External links
 
 
 Dr Sinead Morrissey' profile at The Queen's University, Belfast
 Profile on ContemporaryWriters.com

1972 births
Living people
Women poets from Northern Ireland
Writers from Belfast
People from Portadown
Alumni of Trinity College Dublin
People educated at Belfast High School
20th-century Irish poets
21st-century Irish poets
21st-century women writers from Northern Ireland
T. S. Eliot Prize winners